Galleria d'Arte Moderna or Galleria d'arte moderna may refer to:

 The Galleria d'Arte Moderna Gama in Albenga, Liguria
 The Galleria d'Arte Moderna e Contemporanea in Bergamo, Lombardy
 The Galleria d'Arte Moderna, Bologna in Bologna, Emilia-Romagna
 The Galleria d'Arte Moderna Aroldo Bonzagni in Cento, Emilia-Romagna
 The Galleria d'Arte Moderna Carlo Rizzarda in Feltre, the Veneto
 The Galleria d'Arte Moderna in Palazzo Pitti in Florence, Tuscany
 The Galleria d'Arte Moderna, Genoa in Genoa, Liguria
 The Galleria d'Arte Moderna, Milan in Milan, Lombardy
 The Galleria d'Arte Moderna Giannoni, in Novara, Piemonte
 The Galleria d'Arte Moderna, Palermo in Palermo, Sicily
 The Galleria d'Arte Moderna Ricci Oddi in Piacenza, Emilia-Romagna
 The Galleria d'Arte Moderna Palazzo Forti in Verona, the Veneto
 The Civica Galleria d'Arte Moderna, Savona in Savona, Liguria
 The Galleria Civica d'Arte Moderna in Spoleto, Umbria
 The Galleria Civica d'Arte Moderna e Contemporanea in Turin, Piemonte
 The Galleria Civica d'Arte Moderna e Contemporanea di Latina in Latina, Lazio
 The Galleria Civica d'Arte Moderna Palazzo S. Margherita in Modena, Emilia-Romagna
 The Galleria Comunale d'Arte Moderna, Rome in Rome, Lazio
 The Galleria Comunale d'Arte Moderna e Contemporanea in Viareggio, Tuscany
 The Galleria Internazionale d'Arte Moderna in Venice, the Veneto
 The Galleria Nazionale d'Arte Moderna in Rome, Lazio